Guys Hill is a rural locality in Melbourne, Victoria, Australia, 43 km south-east of Melbourne's Central Business District, located within the Shire of Cardinia local government area. Guys Hill recorded a population of 388 at the 2021 census.

Guys Hill is located about halfway between Beaconsfield and Upper Beaconsfield. The Guys Hill Post Office opened on 1 September 1942.

Golfers play at the Berwick-Montuna Golf Club on Emerald-Beaconsfield Road, Guys Hill.

See also
 Shire of Pakenham — Guys Hill was previously within this former local government area.

References

Shire of Cardinia